NGC 5822 is an open cluster of stars in the southern constellation of Lupus. It was discovered by English Astronomer John Herschel on July 3, 1836, and lies close to another cluster, NGC 5823, which suggests there may be a physical association.

NGC 5822 is an intermediate age cluster, estimated at around 900 million years old, and it is located nearby at a distance of 2,700 light years. The Trumpler class of this cluster is III 2m. The cluster is considered low mass at ~1,700 times the mass of the Sun.

Measuring the abundances of a set of F-type stars that are probable members demonstrates the cluster metallicity is very similar to the Sun. It displays an extended main sequence turnoff on the Hertzsprung–Russell diagram, most likely due to differences in stellar rotation. Two barium stars have been identified in NGC 5822, making it only the second cluster shown to host these objects as of 2013.

Gallery

References

External links
 
 

Open clusters
Lupus (constellation)
5822